Spiaggia was an Italian restaurant in Chicago on  Michigan Avenue at Oak Street. 
After 37 years on the "Magnificent Mile,"  Spiaggia   closed permanently, having never reopened following its COVID-19 closure in March 2020. 

It was nominated for the James Beard Award for Outstanding Restaurant in 2007 and 2010.

Tony Mantuano was the chef for 35 years; he won the James Beard Award for Best Chefs in America in 2005. 

The Michelin Guide called it "one of Chicago’s most beloved Italian restaurants" and the restaurant earned and retained a Michelin star  for 12 consecutive years. The Chicago Tribune  considered Spiaggia the best Italian restaurant in Chicago.

President-elect Obama and his wife dined at Spiaggia following his historic election victory in 2008.

See also
Tony Maws
Missy Robbins
Sarah Grueneberg
List of Italian restaurants

References 

European restaurants in Chicago
Michelin Guide starred restaurants in Illinois
Defunct Italian restaurants in the United States
Italian restaurants in Illinois